(born July 26, 1974) is a Japanese musical lyricist and keyboardist under Giza Studio label. She is a former member of the Japanese pop band Garnet Crow, primarily as the lead songwriter and keyboardist.

Biography
Since she was 4, and until she was 19, she took flute and piano lessons. After graduating from college in 1999, she began showing off her talents in a number of auditions. Her earlier works were associated with Maki Ohguro, Deen, Field of View, WAG and Wands.

After creating the band Garnet Crow in 1999 as a indie band and in 2000 as a major band, she has been continuing providing work to a number of Giza Studio artists as Takaoka Ai, Shiori Takei, Hayami Kishimoto and Sayuri Iwata. She has also worked has to Hitoshi Okamoto on his solo work as lyricist.

After Garnet Crow disbanded, she composed one song for the Japanese singer Meg in 2014. As of 2018, her whereabouts are unknown.

List of provided lyrics

Field of View
 Crash (Nana's debut song as lyricist)
 Aoi Kasa de (青い傘で)

Deen
 Tooi Tooi Mirai he (遠い遠い未来へ)

Wag
 Free Magic
 Kanashimi no Ame (悲しみの雨)

Wands
 Kyou, Nanika no Hazumi de Ikiteiru (「今日、ナニカノハズミデ生きている」)

Maki Ohguro
 Taiyou no Kuni he Ikouyo Suguni (太陽の国へ行こうよ すぐに)

Azumi Uehara
 Aoi Aoi Kono Chikyuu ni (青い青いこの地球に)
 Special Holynight

Superlight
 First fine ride
 Res-no
Sweet×2 Summer Rain
Happy Trash
Autumn Sky
Lost Child
It's only one
Sphere
Stray Beast

Hayami Kishimoto
 Open Your Heart
 Mei Q ~Meikyuu~-Make you-
 Aisuru Kimi ga Soba ni Ireba (愛する君が傍にいれば)
 Soda Pop
 Never Change
 Kamawanaide (カマワナイデ)
 Reigning star
 It's so easy
 Mienai Story (みえないストーリー)
 Onaji Sekai de (同じ世界で)
 Sutekina Yume wo Miyoune (素敵な夢みようね)
 Aitakute (会いたくて)

Soul Crusaders
 Safety Love
 Lonesome Tonight ~Kimi Dake Mitsumeteru~ (Lonesome Tonight 〜君だけ見つめてる〜)
 Resolution, Holiday, Free my mind, Do you feel like i like (Flavor of Life)

Ai Takaoka
 Summer Flooding
 Never to return
 To Beat The Blues
 Natsu no aru Hi ni (夏のある日に)

Shiori Takei
 Shizukanaru Melody (静かなるメロディ)
 Kimi ni Koishiteru (君に恋してる)
 Sakurairo (桜色)
 Close Line, Yuunagi (夕凪) (My Favorite Things)
 Kitto mou Koi ni wa Naranai (きっともう恋にはならない)
 Like a little Love

Sayuri Iwata
 Aozora no Neko (空色の猫)

MEG
Clair de lune

Essay
80,0 Azuki Nana Photography and Anthology ( C0095)

See also
Garnet Crow discography
Hitoshi Okamoto discography

References

Being Inc. artists
Japanese composers
Japanese women composers
Japanese music arrangers
Garnet Crow
Living people
1974 births